Copeland Creek may refer to:

Copeland Creek (California), a stream in California
Copeland Creek (Rogue River tributary), a stream in Oregon